The 1955 Ice Hockey World Championships was the 22nd edition of the Ice Hockey World Championships. The tournament was held in Düsseldorf, Dortmund, Krefeld and Cologne, West Germany from February 25 to March 6, 1955.  A total of 14 nations participated in this World Championship, which was a new record for the postwar era. As a result, the teams were seeded with the strongest 9 teams placed in Pool A (the championship pool) and the remaining 5 nations as well as the West German B team placed in Pool B.

Canada, represented by the Penticton Vees of the Okanagan Senior League, won their 16th international title. For the second straight year both the Soviets and Canadians were undefeated until they played each other in the final game of the tournament. This time Canada won 5–0, giving the Soviets the silver medal, and their second European Championship. Czechoslovakia won the bronze by dominating the weaker teams, drawing the Americans, and narrowly defeating the Swedes.

Despite the victory, the Canadian Press reported sentiments from Canadian players and spectators that "Canada should never again take part in the tournament under its present setup", and Canadian Amateur Hockey Association president W. B. George was concerned that the game in Europe took on political and religious meanings in which Canada did not want to become involved.

World Championship Group A (West Germany)

Final Round

Standings

Tournament awards
 Best players selected by the directorate:
 Best Goaltender:  Don Rigazio
Best Defenceman:  Karel Gut
Best Forward:  Bill Warwick

World Championship Group B (West Germany)

Final Round

Standings 

Note:West Germany B games were unofficial.

European Championship medal table

Citations

References
 
Complete results

IIHF Men's World Ice Hockey Championships
World Championships
1955
World
February 1955 sports events in Europe
March 1955 sports events in Europe
Sports competitions in Düsseldorf
Sports competitions in Cologne
20th century in Düsseldorf
20th century in Cologne
20th century in Dortmund
1950s in North Rhine-Westphalia
Sports competitions in Dortmund
Sport in Krefeld